Vicha Ratanapakdee (1936 – January 28, 2021) was an 84-year old Thai American man who was killed by being forcefully pushed to the ground in a daylight attack in San Francisco, California.

Assault
Ratanapakdee was walking in the Anza Vista neighborhood of San Francisco on the morning of January 28 when 19-year-old Antoine Watson ran across the street and violently shoved him to the ground. Ratanapakdee's head hit the pavement as he fell. He died shortly after arrival in the hospital. The assault was captured on a CCTV camera across the street.

Suspects
Two days after the assault, Antoine Watson, a 19-year-old African American from Daly City, California, was arrested and charged with assault with a deadly weapon, elder abuse and murder. Watson pled not guilty.

Malaysia Goo, a 20-year-old woman from Daly City, was also arrested as an accessory after the fact.

Personal life

Ratanapakdee was born in Thailand (then known as Siam) in 1936, before emigrating to the United States.

Responses
Ratanapakdee's family has expressed the belief that the death was motivated by racism. Ratanapakdee's death took place in the context of what some describe as a broader wave of racially motivated attacks and violences on Asian-Americans in the Bay Area and other parts of the nation. Some authors have mentioned tensions between African-Americans and Asian-Americans as a result of this case and several others.

The Thai Ministry of Foreign Affairs issued a warning to all Thais living in the United States to be alert against racially motivated hate crimes.

San Francisco District Attorney Chesa Boudin called the crime "heinous" but thought, according to the evidence, that the attack wasn't racially motivated, stating that "the defendant was in some sort of a temper tantrum." The family of Ratanapakdee expressed outrage over the characterization of the attack as a "temper tantrum", finding the comments to be disheartening and inappropriate for the severity of the crime. Boudin later clarified his comments, stating that he was referring to the perpetrator's conduct before the crime. According to the family, Boudin had planned to participate in a vigil for Ratanapakdee, but did not show up after the family told him they were not interested in taking pictures or videos with him.

Catherine Stefani, a member of the San Francisco Board of Supervisors, proposed renaming Sonora Lane in Anza Vista after Ratanapakdee. The resolution is supported by the Southeast Asian Development Center and Ratanapakdee's family. On September 30, 2022, it was announced that the street would be renamed “Vicha Ratanapakdee Way”, and would be officialized the next day. Announced speakers were his daughter, Monthanus Ratanapakdee, actor Daniel Dae Kim, and activist Amanda Nguyen.

On October 1, 2022, Sonora Lane, a stairway that connects Terra Vista and O’Farrell streets at Anza Vista neighborhood, was renamed to 'Vicha Ratanapakdee Way', in honor of him.

See also

Responses
 Stop AAPI Hate – non-profit formed in response to racist attacks on the AAPI community as a result of the COVID-19 pandemic
 Stop Asian Hate – demonstrations, protests, and rallies against violence targeting Asians in the United States

Deaths
 Killing of Vincent Chin – killing of a Chinese-American man in Michigan 
 Killing of Ee Lee – killing of a Hmong-American woman in Wisconsin 
 Murder of Mohammad Anwar – murder of a Pakistani-American man in Washington D.C. 
 Killing of Yao Pan Ma – attack of a Chinese-American man in New York City, which resulted in the man's death a few months later
 Death of Michelle Go – pushed into the path of an oncoming subway train in New York City, which caused her death
 Killing of Christina Yuna Lee – stabbed to death inside her apartment in New York City

References

2021 in San Francisco
2021 controversies in the United States
January 2021 crimes in the United States
January 2021 events in the United States
2020s crimes in California
Asian-American issues
Asian-American-related controversies
African-American–Asian-American relations
Thai American
Racially motivated violence against Asian-Americans
Crimes in San Francisco
Deaths by person in California
Hate crimes